The Francis Parkman Prize, named after Francis Parkman, is awarded by the Society of American Historians for the best book in American history each year. Its purpose is to promote literary distinction in historical writing. The Society of American Historians is an affiliate of the American Historical Association.

Eligibility
The Parkman Prize is offered annually to a non-fiction book, including biography, that is distinguished by its literary merit and makes an important contribution to the history of what is now the United States. The author need not be a citizen or resident of the United States, and the book need not be published in the United States. Textbooks, edited collections, bibliographies, reference works, and juvenile books are ineligible. The book's copyright must be in the previous year.

The prize
In 2013 the prize consisted of a certificate and $2,000. A certificate is also presented to the publisher. The prize is awarded at the society's annual meeting in May.

Winners
1957 – George F. Kennan for Russia Leaves the War
1958 – Arthur M. Schlesinger, Jr. for The Crisis of the Old Order
1959 – Ernest Samuels for Henry Adams:  The Middle Years
1960 – Matthew Josephson for Edison:  A Biography
1961 – Elting E. Morison for Turmoil and Tradition:  A Study of the Life and Times of Henry L. Stimson
1962 – Leon Wolff for Little Brown Brother:  How the United States Purchased and Pacified the Philippine Islands at the Century's Turn
1963 – James Thomas Flexner for That Wilder Image:  The Painting of America's Native School from Thomas Cole to Winslow Homer
1964 – William Leuchtenburg for Franklin D. Roosevelt and the New Deal
1965 – Willie Lee Nichols Rose for Rehearsal for Reconstruction: The Port Royal Experiment
1966 – Daniel J. Boorstin for The Americans: The National Experience
1967 – William H. Goetzmann for Exploration and Empire:  The Explorer and the Scientist in the Winning of the American West
1969 – Winthrop Jordan for White Over Black: American Attitudes Toward the Negro, 1550-1812
1970 – Theodore A. Wilson for The First Summit: Roosevelt and Churchill at Placentia Bay, 1941
1971 – James MacGregor Burns for Roosevelt: The Soldier of Freedom, 1940-1945
1972 – Joseph P. Lash for Eleanor and Franklin: The Story of Their Relationship, based on Eleanor Roosevelt's Private Papers
1973 – Kenneth S. Davis for FDR: The Beckoning of Destiny, 1882-1928
1974 – Robert W. Johannsen for Stephen A. Douglas
1975 – Robert A. Caro for The Power Broker: Robert Moses and the Fall of New York
1976 – Edmund S. Morgan for American Slavery, American Freedom
1977 – Irving Howe for World of Our Fathers
1978 – David McCullough for The Path Between the Seas: The Creation of the Panama Canal, 1870-1914
1979 – R. David Edmunds for The Potawatomis: Keepers of the Fire
1980 – Leon F. Litwack for Been in the Storm So Long: The Aftermath of Slavery
1981 – Charles Royster for A Revolutionary People at War:  The Continental Army and American Character, 1775-1783
1982 – William S. McFeely for Grant: A Biography
1983 – John R. Stilgoe for Common Landscape of America, 1580-1845
1984 – William Cronon for Changes in the Land, Revised Edition: Indians, Colonists, and the Ecology of New England
1985 – Joel Williamson for The Crucible of Race: Black-White Relations in the American South since Emancipation
1986 – Kenneth T. Jackson for Crabgrass Frontier: The Suburbanization of the United States
1987 – Michael G. Kammen for A Machine That Would Go of Itself: The Constitution in American Culture
1988 – Eric Larrabee for Commander in Chief: Franklin Delano Roosevelt, His Lieutenants, and Their War
1989 – Eric Foner for Reconstruction: America's Unfinished Revolution, 1863-1877
1990 – Geoffrey C. Ward for A First-Class Temperament: The Emergence of Franklin Roosevelt
1991 – Paul E. Hoffman for A New Andalucia and a Way to the Orient: The American Southeast During the Sixteenth Century
1992 – Richard White for The Middle Ground: Indians, Empires, and Republics in the Great Lakes Region, 1650-1815
1993 – David McCullough for Truman
1994 – David Levering Lewis for W. E. B. Du Bois: Biography of a Race, 1868-1919
1995 – John Putnam Demos for The Unredeemed Captive: A Family Story from Early America
1996 – Robert D. Richardson, Jr. for Emerson: The Mind on Fire
1997 – Drew Gilpin Faust for Mothers of Invention: Women of the Slaveholding South in the American Civil War
1998 – John M. Barry for Rising Tide: The Great Mississippi Flood of 1927 and How It Changed America
1999 – Elliott West for The Contested Plains: Indians, Goldseekers, & the Rush to Colorado
2000 – David M. Kennedy for Freedom from Fear: The American People in Depression and War, 1929-1945
2001 – Fred Anderson for Crucible of War: The Seven Years' War and the Fate of Empire in British North America, 1754-1766
2002 – Louis Menand for The Metaphysical Club: A Story of Ideas in America
2003 – James F. Brooks for Captives and Cousins: Slavery, Kinship, and Community in the Southwest Borderlands
2004 – Suzanne Lebsock for A Murder in Virginia: Southern Justice on Trial
2005 – Alan Trachtenberg for Shades of Hiawatha: Staging Indians, Making Americans, 1880-1930
2006 – Megan Marshall for The Peabody Sisters: Three Women Who Ignited American Romanticism
2007 – John H. Elliott for Empires of the Atlantic World: Britain and Spain in America 1492-1830
2008 – Jean Edward Smith for FDR
2009 – Jared Farmer for On Zion's Mount: Mormons, Indians, and the American Landscape
2010 – Blake Bailey for Cheever: A Life
2011 – Jefferson Cowie for Stayin' Alive: The 1970s and the Last Days of the Working Class
2012 – Richard White for Railroaded: The Transcontinentals and the Making of Modern America
2013 - Fredrik Logevall for Embers of War: The Fall of an Empire and the Making of America's Vietnam
2014 - Philip Shenon for A Cruel and Shocking Act: The Secret History of the Kennedy Assassination
2015 - Danielle Allen for Our Declaration: A Reading of the Declaration of Independence in Defense of Equality
2016 - Christine Leigh Heyrman for American Apostles: When Evangelicals Entered the World of Islam
2017 - Joe Jackson for Black Elk: The Life of an American Visionary
2018 - Christina Snyder for Great Crossings: Indians, Settlers & Slaves in the Age of Jackson
2019 - David W. Blight for Frederick Douglass: Prophet of Freedom
2020 - Charles King for Gods of the Upper Air: How a Circle of Renegade Anthropologists Reinvented Race, Sex, and Gender in the Twentieth Century
2021 - Christopher Tomlins for In the Matter of Nat Turner: A Speculative History
2022 - Nicole Eustace for Covered with Night: A Story of Murder and Indigenous Justice in Early America.

Francis Parkman Prize for Special Achievement
The Francis Parkman Prize for Special Achievement is periodically awarded for scholarly and professional distinction. Established in 1962, it has been awarded only five times.

Winners
 1994 - Walter Lord
 1988 - Forrest Pogue
 1974 - Alfred A. Knopf
 1970 - Samuel Eliot Morison
 1962 - Allan Nevins

See also

 List of history awards

References

External links
 Francis Parkman Prize at the Society of American Historians
 Society of American Historians
 Francis Parkman Prize at lovethebook

Historiography of the United States
American history awards
History books about the United States
American Historical Association